Sympegma are a genus of flowering plants in the amaranth family Amaranthaceae, native to temperate Asia. Woody subshrubs, they are often the dominant species in the high (1,800 to 2,200m) alkaline deserts in which they live.

Species
Currently accepted species include:

Sympegma elegans G.L.Chu
Sympegma regelii Bunge

References 

Amaranthaceae
Amaranthaceae genera
Taxa named by Alexander von Bunge